The Gasconade Valley Conference is a high school athletic conference comprising small-size high schools located in eastern central Missouri. The conference members are located in Crawford, Iron, and Maries counties.

Members

State championships

Cuba Wildcats 

 1992 Boys Cross Country (1A-2A)
 1996 Scholar Bowl (3A)
 1997 Scholar Bowl (3A)
 1998 Scholar Bowl (3A)

Steelville Cardinals 

 1987 Girls Cross Country (1A-2A)
 1988 Girls Cross Country (1A-2A)

Viburnum Blue Jays 

 1986 Boys Cross Country (1A-2A)
 2000 Boys Track and Field (1A)

Vienna Eagles 

 1983 Softball (1A-2A)
 1984 Softball (1A-2A)
 2020 Softball (1A)

References 

Missouri high school athletic conferences
High school sports conferences and leagues in the United States